Runje may refer to:

 Vedran Runje (born 1976), a Croatian footballer and goalkeeper. 
 Zlatko Runje (born 1979), a Croatian footballer and goalkeeper.
 Ivan Runje (born 1990), a Croatian footballer.

Croatian surnames